Elections to Gosport Council were held on 2 May 2002.  The whole council was up for election with boundary changes since the last election in 2000 increasing the number of seats by 4. The council stayed under no overall control.

After the election, the composition of the council was
Labour 12
Liberal Democrat 12
Conservative 10

Election result
The table below only tallies the votes of the highest polling candidate for each party within each ward. This is known as the top candidate method and is often used for multi-member plurality elections.

Ward results

Alverstoke

Anglesey

Bridgemary North

Bridgemary South

Brockhurst

Christchurch

Elson

Forton

Grange

Hardway

Lee East

Lee West

Leesland

Peel Common

Privett

Rowner and Holbrook

Town

References
2002 Gosport election result
 Ward results
Gosport: Tories slide from first to third place

2002
2002 English local elections
2000s in Hampshire